The year 2015 saw releases of numerous video games as well as a follow-up to Nintendo's portable 3DS console, the New Nintendo 3DS. Top-rated games originally released in 2015 included Metal Gear Solid V: The Phantom Pain, The Witcher 3: Wild Hunt, Bloodborne,  Undertale, and Fallout 4.  Sales of video games in 2015 reached $61 billion, according to analysis firm SuperData, an 8% increase from 2014. Of this, the largest sector was in computer game sales and subscription services, accounting for $32 billion. Mobile games revenues were at $25.1 billion, a 10% increase from 2014. Digital sales on consoles made up the remaining $4 billion.

In the United States, the Entertainment Software Association (ESA) and the NPD Group estimated total video game market revenues at $23.5 billion, a 5% increase from 2014. Of this, the total software market was $16.5 billion, with the NPD Group estimating retail sales subset at $13.1 billion. The ESA reported that there were 2,457 companies in the United States involved in developing or publishing video games that directly supported 65,678 workers (37,122 in developing, 28,556 in publishing) with about another 154,000 indirectly supporting the industry, such as through contracting or video game journalism. The total contribution to the US's gross national product from the industry was $11.7 billion.	

In the United Kingdom, the total video game market was valued at nearly 4.2 billion, according to figures from Ukie and MCV. The largest segments were in digital software (£1.2 billion) and mobile games (£664 million), while sales of consoles dropped to £689 million.

Top-rated games

Major awards

Critically acclaimed titles
Metacritic (MC) and GameRankings (GR) are aggregators of video game journalism reviews.

Financial performance

Highest-grossing games
The following were 2015's top ten highest-grossing video games in terms of worldwide revenue (including physical sales, digital purchases, subscriptions, microtransactions, free-to-play and pay-to-play) across all platforms (including mobile, PC and console platforms). Three of the top ten highest-grossing games are published or owned by Tencent, including the top-grossing title League of Legends.

Best-selling games

Events
{| class="wikitable sortable"
|-
! Month
! Day(s)
! Event
|-
| rowspan="3"|January
| 7
| Zombie Studios, the creator of the Spec Ops series, was shut down.
|-
| 23–25
| PAX South 2015 held in Henry B. Gonzalez Convention Center
|-
| 30
| Sega continues reduction of western businesses and focus on digital that began in 2012.
|-
| rowspan="5"|February
| rowspan="2"|3
| Sony sold Sony Online Entertainment to Columbus Nova. The company was renamed into Daybreak Game Company.
|-
| Video game critic Joystiq was shut down by AOL.
|-
| 19
| Sega Networks, a subsidiary of Sega, acquired Demiurge Studios.
|-
| 20
| tri-Ace, the developer of Star Ocean and Valkyrie Profile, was acquired by Nepro Japan.
|-
| 25
| The website version of video game critic Computer and Video Games was merged into GamesRadar+ by Future plc.
|-
| rowspan="7"|March
| 2–6
| Game Developers Conference 2015 held in San Francisco, California.
|-
| 2–6
| Independent Games Festival held in San Francisco, California.
|-
| 4
| Electronic Arts shut down the headquarters of Maxis in Emeryville, which has created franchises such as SimCity and Spore.
|-
| 6–8
| PAX East 2015 held at the Boston Convention and Exhibition Center.
|-
| 12–14
| EGX Rezzed 2015 held at the Tobacco Dock, London.
|-
| 17
| Nintendo Co. Ltd. announced their affiliation with Japanese mobile game developer DeNA and Nintendo Switch, a new console.
|-
| 23
| Raven Software celebrated its 25th anniversary.
|-
| rowspan="6"|April
| 1
| Bandai Namco Games was renamed into Bandai Namco Entertainment.
|-
| 15
| 2K Australia, the developer of Borderlands: The Pre-Sequel was shut down by Take-Two Interactive.
|-
| 17
| Phil Harrison, the World Wide Corporate Vice President of Microsoft Studios departed from Microsoft.
|-
| 20
| Matthew Armstrong, creator of the Borderlands series, left Gearbox Software.
|-
| 27
| Following the cancellation of Silent Hills, Konami delisted itself from the New York Stock Exchange.
|-
| 30
| Services of OnLive were discontinued as the asset was acquired by Sony Computer Entertainment.
|-
| rowspan="3"|May
| 4
| Spark Unlimited, the developer of Lost Planet 3 and Call of Duty: Finest Hour was shut down.
|-
| 22
| BioWare celebrated its 20th anniversary.
|-
| 26
| Oskari Häkkinen, head of franchise development of Remedy Entertainment, left Remedy.
|-
| rowspan="11"|June
| 3
| CEO of Remedy Entertainment, Matias Myllyrinne, departed from the company for Wargaming.
|-
| 8
| Paul Sams replaced Ru Weerasuriya as Ready at Dawn's CEO.
|-
| 9
| Chris Avellone, co-founder of Obsidian Entertainment, departed from the company.
|-
| 11
| Housemarque celebrated its 20th anniversary.
|-
| 12
| Arc System Works purchased the rights to develop video games for the Double Dragon, River City Ransom, and Super Dodge Ball series from the now-defunct Technos.
|-
| 16–18
| E3 2015 held at the Los Angeles Convention Center.
|-
| 16
| Square Enix unveiled new studio Tokyo RPG Factory.
|-
| 21
| Tale of Tales, the developer of Sunset, was closed down.
|-
| 24
| People Can Fly, formerly Epic Games Poland, was split from Epic Games. It became an independent studio and acquired the Bulletstorm IP.
|-
| 29
| Disney Infinity publisher Disney Interactive was merged with Disney Consumer Products, the developer of Playmation to form a new division called "Disney Consumer Products and Interactive Media"
|-
| 30
| Club Nintendo was discontinued in North America.
|-
| rowspan="10"| July
| 4–5
| MineCon has been held at the ExCeL London Exhibition and Conference Centre.
|-
| 11
| Satoru Iwata, President and CEO of Nintendo, died at age 55.
|-
| 13
| Electronic Arts formed new studio called EA Motive. The studio is led by former Ubisoft director Jade Raymond.
|-
| 17–19
| SGC 2015 to be held at the Embassy Suites Frisco Hotel & Convention Centre.
|-
| 22
| John Smedley stepped down as Daybreak Game Company's President and CEO.
|-
| 23–26
| QuakeCon 2015 to be held in Dallas, Texas.
|-
| 27
| China's government fully lifts the ban on the sales of video game consoles within the country.
|-
| 27
| Razer Inc. acquired all the software assets of Ouya.
|-
| rowspan="2"| 29
| Windows 10 was released.
|-
| Yager Development filed for insolvency for its production division Yager Productions GmbH
|-
| rowspan="3"|August
| 5–9
| Gamescom 2015 was held in Cologne, Germany.
|-
| 21
| Remedy Entertainment celebrated its 20th anniversary.
|-
| 28–31
| PAX Prime to be held in Seattle, WA.
|-
| rowspan="8"|September
| 2
| 2015 GameStop Expo at The Venetian Las Vegas resort.
|-
| 14
| Tatsumi Kimishima is appointed president of Nintendo after the death of Satoru Iwata in July 2015. Nintendo EAD and Nintendo SPD was merged, forming Nintendo Entertainment Planning & Development.
|-
| 15
| Sony announced that Project Morpheus was renamed into PlayStation VR.
|-
| 17–20
| Tokyo Game Show 2015 at the Makuhari Messe in Tokyo.
|-
| 24
| Maxis was reassigned to the EA Mobile division of Electronic Arts.
|-
| 24–27
| EGX 2015 at the NEC in Birmingham, UK.
|-
| rowspan="2"|30
| Club Nintendo was discontinued in Europe and Japan.
|-
| Twisted Pixel Games was separated from Microsoft Studios and became an independent studio again.
|-
| rowspan="9"|October
| 2
| Microsoft purchased Havok from Intel.
|-
| 2-4
| EGS was held at Centro Banamex in Mexico City.
|-
| 3
| FiraxiCon was held by Firaxis Games at the Baltimore Convention Center in Maryland.
|-
| 6
| Ubisoft acquired The Crew'''s developer Ivory Tower.
|-
| 8-12
| Brasil Game Show 2015 held in Expo Center Norte, São Paulo
|-
| 11–13
| Firstlook festival 2015 at Jaarbeurs Utrecht in Utrecht, Netherlands.
|-
| 13
| Ubisoft acquired Longtail Studios and renamed it to Ubisoft Halifax.
|-
| 28
| Paris Games Week in Paris, France.
|-
| 29
| Paradox Interactive purchased White Wolf Publishing and all its assets, including World of Darkness and Vampire: The Masquerade from CCP Games.
|-
| rowspan="7"|November
| 2
| Activision Blizzard acquired Candy Crush Saga developer King for $5.9 billion.
|-
| 4
| Konami shuttered its Los Angeles division.
|-
| 6–7
| BlizzCon 2015 at Anaheim Convention Center in Anaheim, California.
|-
| rowspan="3"|6
| Activision Blizzard established a new TV and film studio Activision Blizzard Studios.
|-
| 2K China closed by Take-Two Interactive. Their next game, Borderlands Online was cancelled.
|-
| NCSoft launched a new mobile division named Iron Tiger.
|-
| 12–15
| G-STAR 2015 in Bexco, Busan, South Korea.
|-
| rowspan="9"|December
| 3
| The Game Awards 2015 held in Los Angeles, California.
|-
| 5–6
| PlayStation Experience 2015 held in San Francisco, California.
|-
| 7
| Flying Wild Hog opened a new studio in Cracow, Poland.
|-
| 9
| A new development studio was established by Bethesda Game Studios in Montreal.
|-
| 10
| Electronic Arts established Competitive Gaming Division, a new division headed by Peter Moore which focuses on ESports.
|-
| 11–13
| GaymerX held at the San Jose Marriott Convention Center in San Jose, California.
|-
| 12
| Gearbox Software opened new studio in Quebec.
|-
| rowspan="2"|16
| Crystal Dynamics' studio head Darrell Gallagher left the company.
|-
| Kojima Productions was reestablished as an independent studio headed by Hideo Kojima.
|}

Notable deaths

 June 7 – Christopher Lee, 93, voice actor best known for the character Saruman in the "Lord of the Rings" film franchise and its video game tie-ins.
 July 11 – Satoru Iwata, 55, the fourth president and chief executive officer of Nintendo.

Hardware releases
The list of game-related hardware released in 2015 in North America.

Series with new entries
Series with new installments in 2015 include Anno, Assassin's Creed, Batman: Arkham, Battlefield, Call of Duty, Disgaea, Dirt, Fallout, Fatal Frame,  Five Nights at Freddy's, Forza Motorsport, Guitar Hero, Halo, Heroes of Might and Magic, Hotline Miami, Just Cause, King's Quest, Kirby, Magicka, Mario Party, Mario vs. Donkey Kong, Mario & Luigi, Metal Gear, Minecraft, Mortal Kombat, Need for Speed, OlliOlli, Resident Evil, Rock Band, StarCraft, Star Wars: Battlefront, Tales, The Witcher, Tomb Raider, Tom Clancy's Rainbow Six, Tony Hawk's Pro Skater, Total War, Toy Soldiers, Xenoblade Chronicles, Yakuza and Yoshi.

In addition, 2015 saw the introduction of several new properties, including Bloodborne, Dying Light, Evolve, Life Is Strange, Ori, Rocket League, Splatoon, Undertale, and Until Dawn.

Game releases
The list of games released in 2015 in North America.

January–March

April–June

July–September

October–December

Video game-based film and television releases

Cancelled video games
Cancelled
 Borderlands Online (Win)
 Broforce (PSVita)
 Dying Light (PS3, X360)
 Furious 4 (Win, PS3, X360)
 Galak-Z: The Dimensional (PSVita)
 Gone Home (WiiU)
 Human Element (Win, PS4, XBO)
 Kaio: King of Pirates (3DS)
 Mad Max (PS3, X360)
 Mortal Kombat X (PS3, X360)
 Project CARS (WiiU)
 Scrolls (iOS)
 Shadow Realms (Win)
 Silent Hills (PS4)
 The Black Glove (N/A)

On hold
 Hellraid (PS4, XBO, Win)
 Phantom Dust'' (Xbox One)

See also
2015 in games

Notes

References

2015 in video gaming
Video games by year